The Stade Gabriel-Montpied is a multi-use stadium in Clermont-Ferrand, France.  It is currently used mostly for football matches and is the home stadium of Clermont Foot.
1
It was also the venue for the inaugural edition of the France Women's Sevens in the World Rugby Women's Sevens Series in 2016, and it hosted the 2017 Clermont-Ferrand Sevens, the third leg of the 2017 Rugby Europe Grand Prix series.

The stadium is able to hold 11,980 people and was built in 1995.

External links
Stadium pictures at www.stadiumdb.com

References

Football venues in France
Rugby union stadiums in France
Clermont Foot
Sports venues in Clermont-Ferrand
Sports venues completed in 1995